The Spring Cove School District is a small rural, public school district in Blair County, Pennsylvania. It serves the boroughs of Roaring Spring and Martinsburg plus the townships of North Woodbury, Huston, Taylor, and Freedom. According to 2004 local census data, it serves a resident population of 13,333. In 2009, Spring Cove School District residents’ per capita income was $16,356, while the median family income was $41,619. In the Commonwealth, the median family income was $49,501  and the United States median family income was $49,445, in 2010.

Schools
The district operates four schools: Central High School (Gr. 9–12), Spring Cove Middle School (Gr. 6–8) and two Elementary Schools: Martinsburg Elementary School(Gr. 3–5) and Spring Cove Elementary School (Gr.k–2). Additionally, the district operates Spring Cove Cyber School (K–12).

Extracurriculars
The district offers a variety of clubs, activities and many sports.

The list below is the activities according to PIAA directory report in July 2012.

Athletics
 Baseball - Class AA
 Basketball - Class AA/AAA
 Cross Country - Class AA
 Football - Class AA
 Golf - Class AAAA
 Softball - Class AA
 Swimming and Diving - Class AA
 Girls Tennis - Class AA
 Track and Field - Class AA
 Volleyball - Class AA
 Wrestling - Class AA

Middle School Sports

Boys
Basketball
Basketball
Football
Soccer
Track and Field
Wrestling	

Girls
Basketball
Soccer
Softball
Track and Field
Volleyball

References

External links
 Appalachia Intermediate Unit 8
 Greater Altoona Career & Technology Center
 PIAA Pennsylvania Interscholastic Athletic Association

School districts in Blair County, Pennsylvania